Merton Arthur Dunnigan (January 24, 1894 – March 30, 1937), sometimes known as "Mert" or "Pat", was an American football player. He played college football for Minnesota from 1913 to 1915 and professional football for the Green Bay Packers (1922),  Minneapolis Marines (1924), and Milwaukee Badgers (1925–1926). He later served as an assistant football coach at Minnesota from 1932 to 1937.

Early years
Dunnigan was born in 1895 in Bay City, Michigan. He attended West High School in Minneapolis.

College athlete
He played college football for the University of Minnesota from 1913 to 1915. As a senior, he was selected by Walter Eckersall as a first-team guard on the 1915 All-America college football team. He was also selected by Frank G. Menke as a second-team All-American.

Professional football
He played professional football for Duluth (1917), the Green Bay Packers (1922), Minneapolis Marines (1924), and Milwaukee Badgers (1925–1926). He appeared in 20 NFL games as an end tackle, and guard.

Coaching career
Dunnigan served three different stints as an assistant coach at Minnesota, first under head coach Henry L. Williams from 1917 to 1919, then under Clarence Spears in the 1920s, and finally under Bernie Bierman in the 1930s.

Death
Dunnigan died in his sleep of a cerebral hemorrhage in 1937 at age 42.

See also
 1915 College Football All-America Team

References

1894 births
1937 deaths
American football guards
Players of American football from Minnesota
Minnesota Golden Gophers football players
Green Bay Packers players
Milwaukee Badgers players
Minneapolis Marines players